Karen León (born 30 November 1997) is a Venezuelan judoka. She won one of the bronze medals in the women's 78 kg event at the 2020 Pan American Judo Championships held in Guadalajara, Mexico.

In 2019, she competed in the women's 78 kg event at the Pan American Games held in Lima, Peru. In that same year, she also competed in the women's 78 kg event at the 2019 World Judo Championships held in Tokyo, Japan.

In 2021, she competed in the women's 78 kg event at the Judo World Masters held in Doha, Qatar. In June 2021, she competed in the women's 78 kg event at the World Judo Championships held in Budapest, Hungary.

In July 2021, she walked alongside flagbearer Antonio Díaz during the 2020 Summer Olympics Parade of Nations. She competed in the women's 78 kg event at the 2020 Summer Olympics in Tokyo, Japan.

References

External links
 

Living people
1997 births
Place of birth missing (living people)
Venezuelan female judoka
Judoka at the 2019 Pan American Games
Pan American Games competitors for Venezuela
South American Games medalists in judo
Competitors at the 2018 South American Games
South American Games bronze medalists for Venezuela
Central American and Caribbean Games silver medalists for Venezuela
Central American and Caribbean Games bronze medalists for Venezuela
Central American and Caribbean Games medalists in judo
Competitors at the 2014 Central American and Caribbean Games
Competitors at the 2018 Central American and Caribbean Games
Judoka at the 2020 Summer Olympics
Olympic judoka of Venezuela
21st-century Venezuelan women